The Cahiers de l'Institut de linguistique de Louvain is a peer-reviewed academic journal covering linguistics published by Peeters on behalf of the Université catholique de Louvain. The journal publishes a peer-reviewed supplement series of books, the Série de Pédagogie Linguistique de Louvain.

Abstracting and indexing
The journal is abstracted and indexed in L'Année philologique, Linguistic Bibliography, and the Modern Language Association Database. From 2011 to 2014 it was also covered by Scopus.

References

External links

Linguistics journals
French-language journals
Publications established in 1972
Peeters Publishers academic journals
Quarterly journals
1972 establishments in Belgium